Leptictis is an extinct genus of leptictid non-placental eutherian mammal known from the Late Eocene to Early Oligocene of North America. The type species, L. haydeni, was named in 1868 by Joseph Leidy in honour of Ferdinand Vandeveer Hayden. L. dakotensis was also named by Leidy in 1868, but he originally named it as a separate species, Ictops, which is now seen as the same animal as Lepticitis. Since then, six other species have been named. The hind limbs are proportionally elongated compared to their forelimbs similar to elephant shrews, though to a lesser degree than Leptictidium, and it is suggested that they were capable of rapid bursts of quadrupedal locomotion. The forelimbs were likely used for digging.

References

Leptictids
Eocene mammals
Oligocene mammals
Paleogene mammals of North America
White River Fauna
Fossil taxa described in 1868
Prehistoric mammal genera